The St. Marys River (named Saint Marys River by the United States Geological Survey,) is a  river in the southeastern United States. The river was known to the Indians of the area as Thlathlothlaguphka, or Phlaphlagaphgaw, meaning "rotten fish". French explorer Jean Ribault named the river the Seine when he encountered it in 1562. From near its source in the Okefenokee Swamp, to its mouth at the Atlantic Ocean, it forms a portion of the border between the U.S. states of Georgia and Florida. The river also serves as the southernmost point in the state of Georgia. 
The St. Marys River rises as a tiny stream, River Styx, flowing from the western edge of Trail Ridge, the geological relic of a barrier island/dune system, and into the southeastern Okefenokee Swamp. Arching to the northwest, it loses its channel within the swamp, then turns back to the southwest and reforms a stream, at which point it becomes the St. Marys River. Joined by another stream, Moccasin Creek, the river emerges from the Okefenokee Swamp at Baxter, Florida/Moniac, Georgia. It then flows south, then east, then north, then east-southeast, finally emptying its waters into the Atlantic, near St. Marys, Georgia and Fernandina Beach, Florida.

Name
The U.S. Board on Geographic Names discourages the use of apostrophes in place names, including St. Marys River.

1805 incident
On 6 July 1805 Lieutenant Robert Pigot of  arrived off the harbour in the French privateer schooner Matilda, which the British had captured three days earlier. On 7 July Pigot took Matilda  up the St Marys River to attack three vessels reported to be there. Along the way militia and riflemen fired on Matilda. Eventually the British reached the three vessels, which were lashed in a line across the river. They consisted of a Spanish privateer schooner and her two British prizes, the ship  and the brig Ceres, which the Spanish privateer had captured some two months earlier. The Spaniards had armed Golden Grove with eight 6-pounder guns and six swivels, and given her a crew of 50 men. The brig too was armed with swivels and small arms. The Spanish schooner carried six guns and a crew of 70 men.

Pigot engaged the vessels for an hour, and then after Matilda had grounded, took his crew in her boats and captured Golden Grove. The British then captured the other two vessels. Lastly, Pigot fired on a group of 100 militia, with a field gun, dispersing them. The British had two men killed, and 14 wounded, including Pigot, who had received two bullet wounds to head and one to a leg. A crowd of Americans on the Georgia side of the river watched the entire battle.

War of 1812

See Battle of Fort Peter

Literature
Martin, Charles.  Where the River Ends.  New York, Broadway Books, 2008.  .  An artist and his dying wife fulfill her wish of one last canoe ride from the headwaters of the St. Marys to the sea.

See also
List of rivers of Florida
List of rivers of Georgia (U.S. state)
List of rivers of the Americas by coastline
South Atlantic-Gulf Water Resource Region

References

External links
 State of Florida: Guide to the St. Marys River
 St. Marys River Watershed - Florida DEP

Rivers of Florida
Rivers of Georgia (U.S. state)
Borders of Florida
Borders of Georgia (U.S. state)
Rivers of Charlton County, Georgia
Bodies of water of Nassau County, Florida
Rivers of Camden County, Georgia
Bodies of water of Baker County, Florida
Inlets of Florida